Wilfredo Yaniel Martínez Caraballoso (born 9 January 1985 in Marianao, La Habana) is a Cuban long jumper.

Career
His personal best jump is 8.31 metres, achieved in July 2008 in Cali. He won the silver medal at the 2007 Pan American Games, finished eighth at the 2008 World Indoor Championships and fifth at the 2008 Olympic Games. In 2016 he was disqualified from the 2008 Olympics for doping, and his result was annulled after his 2008 sample was re-tested and failed.

Personal bests
Outdoor
Long jump: 8.31 m A (wind: +1.6 m/s) –  Cali, 6 July 2008
Triple jump: 15.55 m –  La Habana, 14 February 2003
Indoor
Long jump: 8.18 m –  Madrid, 20 February 2010

Competition record

References

External links

Sports reference biography

1985 births
Living people
Cuban male long jumpers
Athletes (track and field) at the 2007 Pan American Games
Athletes (track and field) at the 2008 Summer Olympics
Olympic athletes of Cuba
Doping cases in athletics
Cuban sportspeople in doping cases
Pan American Games medalists in athletics (track and field)
Pan American Games silver medalists for Cuba
Medalists at the 2007 Pan American Games